Cadette may refer to:

Ignatius Cadette (born 1957), a West Indian cricketer
Richard Cadette (born 1965), an English footballer
Cadette, Haiti, a village in the Chambellan commune
Cadette, a place in Martinique
Cadette, a membership level of the Girl Scouts of the USA
Cadette (film), a 1913 film by Léon Poirier

See also
Cadet (disambiguation)